Spinula is a genus of bivalves.

References

External links 

 

Bivalve genera
Tindariidae